Thor Battering the Midgard Serpent is a 1790 painting by the Swiss artist Henry Fuseli. The nude and muscular Thor stands in Hymir's boat with the Jörmungandr on his fish hook. In the top left corner, the god Odin appears as an old man. It depicts one of the most popular myths in Germanic mythology, Thor's fishing trip, which was known to Fuseli through P. H. Mallet's 1755 book Introduction à l'histoire du Dannemarc, translated to English by Thomas Percy in 1770 as Northern Antiquities. The painting was Fuseli's diploma work for his election to the British Royal Academy of Arts in 1790.

The subject has been interpreted in relation to Fuseli's support for the French Revolution, where the serpent could represent the Ancien Régime.

See also
 Thor's Fight with the Giants

References

1790 paintings
Paintings depicting Norse myths
Paintings by Henry Fuseli
Paintings in London
Thor in art
Maritime paintings
Snakes in art